NSW Wallaby was a steam locomotive seeing service in New South Wales.

History
Wallaby was built for the Hoskin Lithgow Steel Works to serve the No. 2 blast furnace plant in 1913. The locomotive was transferred to Port Kembla by Australian Iron and Steel Ltd. (AIS) in 1932. 

In 1933 Wallaby spent a period at South Kembla Colliery before returning to AIS.

Demise and Preservation 
Withdrawn from service at Port Kembla on 19 November 1962 "Wallaby" was placed on static display 5 June 1963. The locomotive was donated to the Illawarra Light Railway Museum in December 1979.

References

Further reading
 

0-4-0 locomotives
Wallaby
Standard gauge locomotives of Australia